Shaquille "Shaq" Richardson (born March 21, 1992) is a professional gridiron football cornerback in the Canadian Football League (CFL) who is currently a free agent. He was drafted by the Pittsburgh Steelers in the fifth round of the 2014 NFL Draft. He played college football at Arizona.

High school
Richardson attended Los Alamitos High School in Los Alamitos, California, where he was an All-Region selection. As a senior, he made 38 tackles and five interceptions on defense and 31 receptions for 540 yards and five touchdowns on offense.

Considered a three-star recruit by Rivals.com, he was rated as the 30th best cornerback prospect of his class.

College career
Richardson originally enrolled in school at UCLA but upon being one of three freshman players dismissed by the team, along with his cousin Paul Richardson and Josh Shirley. After his dismissal, he chose to attend the University of Arizona from 2010 to 2013. In 2010, he played in all 13 games as a true freshman, starting three. In his first career start against Washington State, he intercepted two passes.  He finished the season with 29 tackles, seven pass break-ups, one forced fumble and two picks. In 2011, he played in and started 10 games, recording 47 tackles, a team leading four interceptions (73 yards), five pass break-ups and one forced fumble. In 2012, he played in all 13 games with 11 starts. He recorded 58 total tackles, one interception and 14 pass break-ups. In 2013, he started all 13 games, recording 55 tackles, including three for loss, three interceptions and four pass break-ups.

Professional career

Pittsburgh Steelers
Richardson was drafted by the Pittsburgh Steelers in the fifth round (157th overall) of the 2014 NFL Draft. He was cut from the Steelers 53-man roster prior to the start of the regular season but was then signed to their practice squad.

Kansas City Chiefs
On February 26, 2015, Richardson signed a one-year deal with the Kansas City Chiefs. He was waived by the Chiefs on April 21.

Arizona Cardinals
On July 31, 2015, Richardson was signed by the Arizona Cardinals. On August 31, 2015, he was cut by the Cardinals.

Tennessee Titans
On November 17, 2015, Richardson was signed to the Titans' practice squad.

Carolina Panthers
On May 17, 2016, Richardson signed a 2-year, $960,000 contract with the Carolina Panthers. He was waived on July 14, 2016.

Oakland Raiders
On January 9, 2018, Richardson signed a reserve/future contract with the Oakland Raiders. He was waived/injured on August 6, 2018 and was placed on injured reserve. He was released on August 23, 2018.

Arizona Hotshots
Richardson later joined the Arizona Hotshots of the Alliance of American Football. He was placed on injured reserve on January 30, 2019. He was activated from injured reserve on March 6, 2019. The league ceased operations in April 2019.

Toronto Argonauts
In October 2019, Richardson was signed by the Toronto Argonauts to their practice roster, and then later promoted to their active roster. He signed a contract extension with the Argonauts on January 14, 2021. In 2021, Richardson was named a CFL East Division all-star. He would also go on to win the 109th Grey Cup with the Argonauts during the 2022 CFL season.

On February 14, 2023, Richardson became a free agent.

Personal life
Shaquille Richardson's cousin is wide receiver Paul Richardson.

References

External links
Arizona Wildcats bio

Living people
1992 births
People from Carson, California
American football cornerbacks
Canadian football defensive backs
American players of Canadian football
Arizona Wildcats football players
Pittsburgh Steelers players
Players of American football from California
Sportspeople from Los Angeles County, California
Kansas City Chiefs players
Winnipeg Blue Bombers players
Arizona Cardinals players
Carolina Panthers players
Calgary Stampeders players
Oakland Raiders players
Arizona Hotshots players
Toronto Argonauts players